All Saints' Church is a redundant Anglican church in the village of Thurgarton, Norfolk, England. It is recorded in the National Heritage List for England as a designated Grade I listed building, and is under the care of the Churches Conservation Trust.

History
The church dates from the 14th century.  The west tower fell in 1882, and was replaced by a vestry at the west end in 1924.  The roof was re-thatched in 1984–85.

Architecture

Exterior
All Saints' is constructed in flint and has a thatched roof. Its plan consists of a three-bay nave, a south porch, a chancel and a west vestry.  In the west wall of the nave are two lancet windows. Along the south wall are three two-light windows dating from the 19th century in Decorated style. On the north side is one similar window and a doorway. In the south wall of the chancel are a two-light window with Y-tracery, a priest's door, and a late medieval two-light window. The east window has three lights and dates from the 19th century. At the southeast corner of the church is a buttress through which is a passage. The south porch has two storeys, with the bell sited in the upper storey.

Interior
The nave roof is scissor braced, and the chancel roof is a hammerbeam.  In the church are the remains of a rood stairway.  The interior of the church is notable for its medieval benches with carved ends.  The carvings include poppyheads, an elephant, barrels, mythical beasts, a man, a lion, and fighting dogs.  On a wall are the remains of painted texts.  Also in the church are a 19th-century fretwork screen, and communion rails with balusters.  The font is medieval with an 18th-century cover.

See also
List of churches preserved by the Churches Conservation Trust in the East of England

References

Grade I listed churches in Norfolk
Church of England church buildings in Norfolk
English Gothic architecture in Norfolk
Gothic Revival architecture in Norfolk
Churches preserved by the Churches Conservation Trust
Thatched buildings in England